Fireflies is the sixth studio album by American country music singer Faith Hill. The album was released on August 2, 2005 via Warner Bros. Records Nashville. In its first week, the album sold 329,000 copies, making it the top album on both the Billboard 200 and Top Country Albums chart. Fireflies is her third #1 album, and it has been certified 2× Platinum by the RIAA for US shipments of two million copies. Hill produced the album with Byron Gallimore (who also produced for her husband, Tim McGraw) and Dann Huff.

The album was nominated for the Grammy Award for Best Country Album and the Grammy Award for Best Female Country Vocal Performance ("Mississippi Girl") and won the Grammy Award for Best Country Collaboration with Vocals ("Like We Never Loved at All").

Content
Singles from the album include, in order of release: "Mississippi Girl", "Like We Never Loved at All", "The Lucky One", "Sunshine and Summertime" and "Stealing Kisses". Of these, "Mississippi Girl" was a Number One on the US Billboard country charts. The other singles peaked at numbers 5, 5, 7 and 36 on that chart, respectively. Of the singles, "Mississippi Girl", "Like We Never Loved at All" and "Sunshine and Summertime" were co-written by John Rich of Big & Rich, while The Warren Brothers (Brad and Brett) co-wrote "The Lucky One", a song on which Brett also sings backing vocals. Other backing vocalists on this album include Hill's husband, Tim McGraw (on "Like We Never Loved at All"), Bekka Bramlett, Rhonda Vincent, and Kelly Willis.

Hill produced the entire album, with co-production from Byron Gallimore on tracks 1, 3, 4, 5, 6, 9, 10, and 12, Dann Huff on 7, 8, 13, and 14, and both Gallimore and Huff on 2 and 11.

Critical reception

At Metacritic, the album has an average score of 57, indicating "mixed or average reviews".

Track listing

Personnel
As listed in liner notes.

Musicians
 Greg Barnhill - background vocals (1, 9, 10, 11, 12)
 Bruce Bouton - steel guitar (2, 7, 8, 11), Dobro (8)
 Bekka Bramlett - background vocals (1, 2, 11)
 Tom Bukovac - electric guitar (1, 2, 3, 5-11, 13, 14), acoustic guitar (3, 4, 9)
 Paul Bushnell - bass guitar (all tracks except 5, 8)
 John Catchings - cello (12)
 Matt Chamberlain - drums (8)
 Lisa Cochran - background vocals (13)
 Steve Cohn - accordion (3)
 Perry Coleman - background vocals (2)
 Vinnie Colaiuta - drums (3, 4, 9, 11, 12, 14)
 Eric Darken - percussion (11, 14)
 Dan Dugmore - banjo (1), steel guitar (2, 9, 13), Dobro (5, 6, 10)
 Stuart Duncan - mandolin (1, 5, 6, 7, 10, 13)
 Shannon Forrest - drums (1, 5, 6, 7, 10, 13), percussion (1)
 Paul Franklin - steel guitar (3, 4, 9, 12)
 Byron Gallimore - electric guitar (4, 9), keyboards (5), organ (5), acoustic guitar (10)
 Kenny Greenberg - electric guitar (4, 8, 14), electric mandolin (9)
 Aubrey Haynie - fiddle (3), mandolin (4, 9)
 Mike Henderson - electric guitar (10)
 Wes Hightower - background vocals (3, 4)
 Dann Huff - electric guitar (2, 7), acoustic guitar (8, 11), classical guitar (13)
 Jay Joyce - acoustic guitar (9), electric guitar (9)
 Charlie Judge - keyboards (3, 4, 7, 8, 11-14), organ (11), synthesizer strings (12)
 Tim Lauer - accordion (2)
 Liana Manis - background vocals (3)
 Tim McGraw - background vocals (7)
 Chris McHugh - drums (2)
 Gene Miller - background vocals (9)
 Gordon Mote - piano (13)
 Jimmy Nichols - keyboards (1, 2, 10), piano (4, 5, 8, 12, 14), accordion (6), organ (9)
 Darrell Scott - mandolin (2, 3, 11, 12), acoustic guitar (3, 9), Weissenborn (9)
 Javier Solis - percussion (1, 9, 10, 12)
 Bryan Sutton - acoustic guitar (1, 5, 6, 10, 12)
 Crystal Taliefero - background vocals (9, 11, 12)
 Rhonda Vincent - background vocals (4)
 Brett Warren - background vocals (9)
 Kelly Willis - background vocals (5, 6)
 Glenn Worf - bass guitar (5, 8)

String section on "Paris"
 Violins: Bruce Dukov, Charlie Bisharat, Darius Campo, Roberto Cani, Susan Chatman, Mario Deleon, Armen Garabedian, Berj Garabedian, Endre Granat, Songa Lee-Kitto, Michael Markman, Robert Matsuda, Sara Parkings, Robert Peterson, Michele Richards, Anatoly Rosinsky, Josefina Vergara, John Wittenberg
 Violas: Evan Wilson, Bob Becker, Denyse Buffum, Roland Kato
 Cellos: Suzie Katayama, Larry Corbett, Steve Erdody, Paula Hochalter, Steve Richards, Dan Smith

Production
 Tracks 1, 3-6, 9, 10, 12 produced by Byron Gallimore, and Faith Hill
 Tracks 7, 8, 13, 14 produced by Dann Huff and Faith Hill
 Tracks 2, 11 produced by Byron Gallimore, Dann Huff, and Faith Hill

Release history

Charts

Weekly charts

Year-end charts

Certifications

References

External links
 

Faith Hill albums
2005 albums
Albums produced by Dann Huff
Albums produced by Byron Gallimore
Warner Records albums